Robert L. "Scoop" Usher (December 6, 1913 – April 20, 1985) was a Democratic politician who served in the Missouri House of Representatives.  Born in Hannibal, Missouri, he was elected to the Missouri House of Representatives on December 28, 1973, in a special election.  Usher had previously served as a Missouri State Highway Patrol Officer. He was first-runner up in 1957, 1958, and 1959 as national champion pistol shooter.  He also played semi-professional basketball.

References

1913 births
People from Hannibal, Missouri
1985 deaths
Members of the Missouri House of Representatives
20th-century American politicians